Corson may refer to:

Places
United States
 Corson County, South Dakota
 Corson, South Dakota
 Corson Inlet, a strait on the southern coast of New Jersey
 Corson's Inlet State Park, New Jersey
Other
 Corson, the main street of Linköping University's Campus Valla, Östergötland, Sweden

Others
 Corson (surname)
 USS Corson (AVP-37), a United States Navy seaplane tender in commission from 1944 to 1946 and from 1951 to 1956
 Corson (singer), French singer, songwriter
 Corson (demon), one of the four principal kings that have power on the seventy-two demons